Matthew James Friedlander (born 1 August 1979) is a former South African cricketer.  Friedlander is a right-handed batsman who bowls right-arm fast-medium.  He was born in Durban, Natal.

Friedlander made his first-class debut for Boland during the 2003/4 season against Free State.  His second and final first-class match for Boland came during the same season against Easterns.  He also made his debut in List-A cricket during this season against North West.  He played 2 further List-A matches during the season against Border and Free State.  In his 3 List-A matches he took 2 wickets at a bowling average of 2/27.

In 2005, he made his first-class debut for CUCCE in 2005 against Essex in England.  From 2005 to 2008, he represented the university in 10 first-class matches, the last of which came against Warwickshire.  In 2005 he also represented a combined British Universities team against the touring Bangladeshis.  During the 2005 season he represented Northamptonshire in a single first-class match against the Bangladeshis.  In his combined first-class career, he scored 260 runs at a batting average of 14.44, with a single half century high score of 81.  With the ball he took 26 wickets at an average of 41.15, with a single five wicket haul of 6/78, which represented his best figures.

In local domestic cricket, he currently plays for Cambridge Granta Cricket Club in the East Anglian Premier Cricket League.

References

External links
Matthew Friedlander at Cricinfo
Matthew Friedlander at CricketArchive

1979 births
Living people
Cricketers from Durban
South African cricketers
Boland cricketers
Northamptonshire cricketers
British Universities cricketers
Cambridge MCCU cricketers